Eugrapta is a genus of moths of the family Noctuidae.

Species
Eugrapta angulata (Pagenstecher, 1900)
Eugrapta igniflua Wileman & South, 1917
Eugrapta venusta (Hampson, 1898)

References

External links
Natural History Museum Lepidoptera genus database

Calpinae